Biru Gewog is a former gewog (village block) of Samtse District, Bhutan. The gewog has an area of 49.04 square kilometres and contains 15 chewogs with 46 villages and 448 households. Biru Gewog comprises part of Sipsu Dungkhag (sub-district), together with Tendu, Bara, Lehereni, and Sipsu Gewogs.

References

Former gewogs of Bhutan
Samtse District